The following is a list of artists who have recorded for New West Records.

References

New West Records